Olgovka is a rural locality (a village) in Rassvetovsky Selsoviet, Davlekanovsky District, Bashkortostan, Russia. The population was 10 as of 2010. There is 1 street.

Geography 
Olgovka is located 12 km northwest of Davlekanovo (the district's administrative centre) by road. Raush is the nearest rural locality.

References 

Rural localities in Davlekanovsky District